Spodnja Gorica is a settlement in the Municipality of Rače–Fram in northeastern Slovenia. It lies on the flatlands on the right bank of the Drava River south of Rače. The area is part of the traditional region of Styria. The municipality is now included in the Drava Statistical Region.

The village chapel was built in 1924. Traces of Neolithic, Bronze Age and Roman period settlements have been identified at excavations in the area of the village.

References

External links
Spodnja Gorica at Geopedia

Populated places in the Municipality of Rače-Fram